Draco spilonotus, the Sulawesi lined gliding lizard, is a lizard endemic to Sulawesi. The species is known from various localities in forested areas of Sulawesi.

The patagium of the male is yellow in colour and has a network of brown lines radiating from the anterior. The gular flag is yellow and rounded in shape.

References

General References
 
 
 

spilonotus
Gliding animals
Endemic fauna of Indonesia
Reptiles of Sulawesi
Taxa named by Albert Günther
Reptiles described in 1872

Helpful Websites, and External Resources 

Draco Volans
Nation Geographic Flying Dragon
Zoological Science Flying Lizards Genus Draco
Herpetological Monographs, 2007